INTU may refer to:

Intu, property company in the United Kingdom
Intuit, (software company)